Macht is a surname. Notable people with the surname include:

David Macht (1882–1961), American pharmacologist
Gabriel Macht (born 1972), American actor
Michael Macht (born 1960), German chief executive
Stephen Macht (born 1942), American actor